Paithur is a village located south of Attur Taluk in Salem District, Tamil Nadu, India.

Farming is the main source of income for the residents.

The distance between Attur to Paithur is 4.3 miles or 6 km (kilometers) and 915.53 meters.

References 

Villages in Salem district